The Potomac Highlands of West Virginia (or just the Potomac Highlands) centers on five West Virginian counties (Grant, Hampshire, Hardy, Mineral, and Pendleton) in the upper Potomac River watershed in the western portion of the state's Eastern Panhandle, bordering Maryland and Virginia.  Because of geographical proximity, similar topography and landscapes, and shared culture and history, the Potomac Highlands region also includes Pocahontas, Randolph, and Tucker counties, even though they are in the Monongahela River or New River watersheds and not that of the Potomac River.

The Potomac Highlands broadly overlaps, but is not identical with, the four-state Allegheny Highlands or High Alleghenies region which includes the relatively high and rugged mountains along and near the Allegheny Front from extreme southern Pennsylvania southward across Maryland and West Virginia into adjacent Virginia.

Geography 
The region's geologic setting and landscape history make the Potomac Highlands one of the most scenic areas within the central Appalachian Mountains.  The eastern part of the region is within the Ridge and Valley physiographic province, where long, steep-sided mountain ridges alternate with parallel broad, flat valleys.  Water gaps, where rivers or streams have cut through the ridges, are important not only for their dramatic scenery, but also for their utility as easy crossings of these otherwise formidable mountains for roads, railroads, and telephone and telegraph lines.  The western portion of the Potomac Highlands is within the Allegheny Plateau, with the Allegheny Front's prominent escarpment providing the boundary between these two areas.

While much of the land in the Potomac Highlands is privately owned, large portions of the area are within the Monongahela National Forest, the George Washington National Forest, or various other kinds of parks, preserves, or other managed wild areas.  A group of sites within the Allegheny Highlands has been proposed for inclusion as a new unit within the U.S. National Park System.

The Fairfax Stone, marking the source of the Potomac River, is along the north edge of the Potomac Highlands, just south of the southern tip of western Maryland.

Ridge and Valley region 
Among notable scenic features or wild areas within the Ridge and Valley portion of the Potomac Highlands are:
 The Germany Valley
 The Germany Valley Overlook, on U.S. 33 on the western slope of North Fork Mountain
 Greenland Gap, a preserve owned by The Nature Conservancy
 Ice Mountain, a preserve owned by The Nature Conservancy
 Lost River State Park
 Nathaniel Mountain Wildlife Management Area
 North Fork Mountain, along the axis of the Wills Mountain Anticline, a long, high ridge crossed only by U.S. 33; Kile Knob, Panther Knob, and Pike Knob are among the mountain's high points
 North Fork Mountain Red Pine Botanical Area
 The North Fork Water Gap, west of Petersburg
 Reddish Knob, on Shenandoah Mountain on the state line with Virginia
 Seneca Caverns, in the Germany Valley
 Seneca Rocks and such similar near-vertical Tuscarora quartzite outcrops as Champe Rocks, Nelson Rocks, and Judy Rocks, all structurally parts of the western limb of the Wills Mountain Anticline.
 Short Mountain Wildlife Management Area
 The Smoke Hole (or Smoke Hole Canyon)
 Smoke Hole Caverns
 Trout Pond Wildlife Management Area

The George Washington National Forest includes six Recreation Areas within the Potomac Highlands’ Ridge and Valley region:  Brandywine RA, Camp Run RA, Rock Cliff RA, Shenandoah Mountain RA, Trout Pond RA, and Wolf Gap RA.

Allegheny Front 
The Allegheny Front provides the setting for various high, openly vegetated areas atop massive outcrops of the Pottsville sandstone, including:
 Spruce Knob, West Virginia's highest point
 Dolly Sods, including the Dolly Sods Recreation Area and the Dolly Sods Wilderness

Appalachian Plateau 
Within the region's three western counties, landscapes of the Appalachian Plateau include such features as:
 Beartown State Park
 Big Ditch Wildlife Management Area
 The Blackwater Canyon
 Blackwater Falls, in Blackwater Falls State Park
 The Canaan Valley, including the Canaan Valley National Wildlife Refuge and Canaan Valley Resort State Park
 Cass Scenic Railroad State Park
 Cranberry Glades Botanical Area
 The Cranberry Wilderness and the Cranberry Backcountry
 Droop Mountain Battlefield State Park
 Gaudineer Knob (within the Gaudineer Knob Recreation Area)
 Greenbrier River Trail State Park
 Handley Wildlife Management Area
 The High Falls of the Cheat River
 Hills Creek Falls
 Kumbrabow State Forest
 The Otter Creek Wilderness
 Seneca State Forest
 The Sinks of Gandy
 The Valley Bend Wetland
 Watoga State Park

The Monongahela National Forest includes a number of Recreation Areas on the Appalachian Plateau, including:  Bear Heaven RA, Bickle Knob RA, Big Bend RA, Bird Run RA, Bishop Knob RA, Cranberry RA, Gaudineer Knob RA, Horseshoe RA, Lake Buffalo RA, Laurel Fork RA, Old House Run RA, Pocahontas RA, Red Creek RA, Red Lick RA, Spruce Knob Lake RA, Stuart RA, and Tea Creek RA.

County information 

The following nine West Virginia counties are included within the Potomac Highlands:

Largest cities

References 

Smith, J. Lawrence, The Potomac Naturalist: The Natural History of the Headwaters of the Historic Potomac (1968), Parsons, West Virginia, McClain Printing Company; ;

External links 

 Stewards of the Potomac Highlands
 West Virginia Division of Tourism Potomac Highlands Website

Regions of West Virginia
Highlands